The 2019 Asian Athletics Championships was the 23rd edition of the Asian Athletics Championships. It was held from 21 to 24 April 2019 at the Khalifa International Stadium in Doha, Qatar. During the closing ceremony of the 22nd Asian Athletics Championships in Bhubaneswar India, President of Asian Athletics Association (AAA) Dahlan Al Hamad officially handed over the AAA Flag to Qatar Olympic Committee Secretary-General and Qatar Athletics Federation President Thani Abdulrahman Al Kuwari. The event was at the Khalifa International Stadium and it served as the test event for the 2019 World Athletics Championships which were held at the same venue.

Medal summary

Men

Women

Mixed

Medal table

Participating nations

References

External links
Official website
Asian Athletics Association
Results book 

 
Asian Athletics Championships
Asian Athletics Championships
Athletics Championships
Asian Athletics Championships
International athletics competitions hosted by Qatar
Asian Athletics Championships
Sports competitions in Doha